Kám is a village in Vas county, Hungary.

External links 
 Street map 

Populated places in Vas County